Heath Spence (born 15 April 1980) is an Australian bobsledder. He was born in Melbourne. He competed at the 2014 Winter Olympics in Sochi, in two-man and four-man bobsleigh.

References 

1980 births
Living people
Bobsledders at the 2014 Winter Olympics
Australian male bobsledders
Olympic bobsledders of Australia